The 1996 Army Cadets football team was an American football team that represented the United States Military Academy in the 1996 NCAA Division I-A football season. In their sixth season under head coach Bob Sutton, the Cadets compiled a 10–2 record and outscored their opponents by a combined total of 379 to 224.  In the annual Army–Navy Game, the Cadets defeated Navy, 28–24. They also lost to Auburn, 32–29, in the 1996 Independence Bowl.

Schedule

Personnel

Game summaries

Ohio

Duke

at North Texas

Yale

vs. Rutgers

Tulane

at Miami (OH)

Lafayette

Air Force

at Syracuse

vs. Navy

President Bill Clinton became the first sitting U.S. president to attend game since 1974.

vs. Auburn

Radio

Some games broadcast on WPLJ–FM 95.5 because of broadcast conflict with the New York Yankees

Rankings

AP poll

Coaches' poll

References

Army
Army Black Knights football seasons
Army Cadets football